The Second EAFF Women's Football Championship was a football competition held from February 18 to February 24, 2008 in Chongqing, China. Japan won the second edition by beating its opponents to finish first, DPR Korea finished second. The winner of the tournament received 50,000 US Dollars, the runner up 30,000, the third placed team 20,000 and the fourth placed team 15,000.

Rounds

Preliminary Competition 
Korea Republic qualified to Final Round.

Final round 

All times, local time

Personal Awards
 Fair play Team – 
 Best Goalkeeper –  Zhang Yanru
 Best Defender –  Hong Myong-gum
 Top Scorer –  Shinobu Ohno
 MVP –  Homare Sawa

References

External links
East Asian Football Championship 2008 Final Competition in China
EAFC 2008 Preliminary Competition Results
RSSSF – results

2008 in Asian football
2008
2008
2008 in Chinese football
2008 in Japanese women's football
2008 in Taiwanese football
2007–08 in Hong Kong football
2008 in Guamanian sports
2008 in North Korean football
2008 in South Korean football
2007–08 in Guamanian football